The Akanyaru River is the main tributary of the Nyabarongo River. It rises in the western highlands of Rwanda and Burundi, flows east and then north along the border between those countries before joining the Nyabarongo River.  The lower stretches contain important but unprotected wetlands, which are under threat from human activity.

Course

The river has sources at about  elevation in the south of Rwanda.
Many of the valleys of the higher tributaries are choked by papyrus, which contains seasonal swamp forests.
The swamp belt is fed from the right by lakes Cyohoha North and Cyohoha South.

Climate

The climate of Rwanda is determined by the  Intertropical Convergence Zone, which creates two rainy seasons.
One lasts from mid-September to mid-December and the other from March to May.
Climate change may be increasing the severity of both floods and droughts.
In the 1997-98 El Nino episode a large number of agricultural plantations in the shallows and swamps of the Nyabarongo and Akanyaru river basins were destroyed.

Flora

Beside the open channels the main plants are Pistia stratiotes (water cabbage), Leersia hexandra (southern cutgrass) and Oryza barthii, a grass in the rice genus.
Nearer to the shore is a combination of Typha australis, Miscanthidium violaceum, Cladium jamaicense with some papyrus.
Cyperus denudatus, Cyperus latifolius and Echinochloa pyramidalis are also found in some parts.
Other parts have pure stands of papyrus.
The swamp forest near the river is dominated by Bridelia micrantha, Ficus verruculosa, Myrica kandtiana and Phoenix reclinata.
Further from the river common species include Acacia polyacantha and Albizia gummifera.

Fauna

The marshland is an area of great biodiversity, particularly of birdlife.
There are records of at least 54 bird species with wetland habitats in the swamp region.
These include migrant Malagasy pond heron, pallid harrier and great snipe.
Lesser kestrel have been seen.
The near-threatened papyrus gonolek is present as is the vulnerable papyrus yellow warbler.
The sitatunga, an antelope, is found in the swamps.

Human activities

The valley is not protected, and much of the land that is only flooded seasonally is cultivated at other times of the year.
The local people also engage in fishing in the river and swamps.
The wetlands are increasingly being used for agriculture.
In the dry season the local people cut and burn the marsh vegetation, steadily destroying the habitat.
In October 2005 Charles Karangwa, the Butare Director for Economic Affairs,
said the people should increase their use of the Akanyaru wetland for crops, particularly maize.
In February 2011 the Minister of Lands and Environment told the people of the Gisagara District to make better use of the Akanyaru swamp, with more modern farming methods.
According to Minister Kamanzi the Nile Basin Initiative Cooperative Framework did not debar use. He said, "There is no agreement that prevents our population from using the water...of course in a good way."

In December 2012 the ministries of Infrastructure and Natural Resources were discussing how best to evaluate the quantity and quality of Akanyaru peat. Two companies, one from India and the other from Turkey, were to take over peat production.
A 100MW peat-fired power plant was to be built by the Turkish developer Hakan Mining and Generation Industry and Trade.

References

Citations

Sources

Rivers of Rwanda
Rivers of Burundi